Eliscu is a surname. Notable people with the surname include:

Edward Eliscu (1902–1998), American lyricist, playwright, producer, and actor
Fernanda Eliscu (1880–1968), Romanian-born American actress
Frank Eliscu (1912–1996), American sculptor and art teacher 
Jenny Eliscu, American music journalist and radio host